Passiflora monadelpha is a species of plant in the family Passifloraceae. It is endemic to Ecuador.

References

monadelpha
Endemic flora of Ecuador
Least concern plants
Taxonomy articles created by Polbot